Bayley may refer to:

 Bayley (wrestler) (born 1989), American professional wrestler
 Bayley (surname)
 Bayley House
 Bayley Scales of Infant Development (BSID), used to sample the intellectual growth of infants and toddlers
 Bayley Seton Hospital

See also
Baley (disambiguation)
Bayley Island